"I Don't Want Nobody to Give Me Nothing (Open Up the Door, I'll Get It Myself)" is a funk song written and recorded by James Brown. It was released as a two-part single, which charted #3 R&B and #20 Pop. The single version of the song did not receive an album release until Foundations of Funk: A Brand New Bag, but a live recording was included on Brown's 1970 album Sex Machine.

The track was sampled by Ice-T in his song "Power" and also sampled by Ed O.G. and Da Bulldogs in their song "I Got To Have It".

References

External links
 AllMusic review

James Brown songs
Songs written by James Brown
1969 singles
1969 songs
King Records (United States) singles